Rainer Schöpp is a German curler and curling coach. He is a former European mixed curling champion.

Career
He represented Germany at his first and only world championship in 1988, finishing in sixth place with a 3–6 win–loss record.

Schöpp has been most successful in representing Germany at the European Mixed Curling Championship. He won the title in 2008, and posted three bronze-medal finishes in 2005, 2007, and 2010.

Schöpp has also represented Germany at the World Senior Curling Championships.

External links

German male curlers
Living people
Date of birth missing (living people)
German curling coaches
Year of birth missing (living people)